Anthony the Great ( Antṓnios; ; ; ; c. 12 January 251 – 17 January 356) was a Christian monk from Egypt, revered since his death as a saint. His feast day is celebrated on 17 January among the Eastern Orthodox and Catholic churches and on Tobi 22 in the Coptic calendar.

The biography of Anthony's life by Athanasius of Alexandria helped to spread the concept of Christian monasticism, particularly in Western Europe via its Latin translations. He is often erroneously considered the first Christian monk, but as his biography and other sources make clear, there were many ascetics before him. Anthony was, however, among the first known to go into the wilderness (about AD 270), which seems to have contributed to his renown. Accounts of Anthony enduring supernatural temptation during his sojourn in the Eastern Desert of Egypt inspired the depiction of his temptations in visual art and literature.

Anthony is appealed to against infectious diseases, particularly skin diseases. In the past, many such afflictions, including ergotism, erysipelas, and shingles, were referred to as Saint Anthony's fire.

Life of Anthony
Most of what is known about Anthony comes from the Life of Anthony. Written in Greek around 360 by Athanasius of Alexandria, it depicts Anthony as an illiterate and holy man who through his existence in a primordial landscape has an absolute connection to the divine truth, which always is in harmony with that of Athanasius as the biographer.

A continuation of the genre of secular Greek biography, it became his most widely read work. Sometime before 374 it was translated into Latin by Evagrius of Antioch. The Latin translation helped the Life become one of the best-known works of literature in the Christian world, a status it would hold through the Middle Ages.

Translated into several languages, it became something of a "best seller" in its day and played an important role in the spreading of the ascetic ideal in Eastern and Western Christianity. It later served as an inspiration to Christian monastics in both the East and the West, and helped to spread the concept of Christian monasticism, particularly in Western Europe via its Latin translations.

Many stories are also told about Anthony in the Sayings of the Desert Fathers.
  
Anthony probably spoke only his native language, Coptic, but his sayings were spread in a Greek translation. He himself dictated letters in Coptic, seven of which are extant.

Life

Early years 
Anthony was born in Koma in Lower Egypt to wealthy landowner parents. When he was about 20 years old, his parents died and left him with the care of his unmarried sister. Shortly thereafter, he decided to follow the gospel exhortation in Matthew 19: 21, "If you want to be perfect, go, sell what you have and give to the poor, and you will have treasures in heaven."  Anthony gave away some of his family's lands to his neighbors, sold the remaining property, and donated the funds to the poor. He then left to live an ascetic life, placing his sister with a group of Christian virgins.

Hermit 
For the next fifteen years, Anthony remained in the area, spending the first years as the disciple of another local hermit. There are various legends that he worked as a swineherd during this period.

According to the Temptation of Saint Anthony (1878) by Félicien Rops:

Anthony maintained a very strict ascetic diet. He ate only bread, salt and water and never meat or wine. He ate at most only once a day and sometimes fasted through two or four days.

According to Athanasius, the devil fought Anthony by afflicting him with boredom, laziness, and the phantoms of women, which he overcame by the power of prayer, providing a theme for Christian art. After that, he moved to one of the tombs near his native village. There it was that the Life records those strange conflicts with demons in the shape of wild beasts, who inflicted blows upon him, and sometimes left him nearly dead.

After fifteen years of this life, at the age of thirty-five, Anthony determined to withdraw from the habitations of men and retire in absolute solitude. He went into the desert to a mountain by the Nile called Pispir (now Der-el-Memun), opposite Arsinoë. There he lived strictly enclosed in an old abandoned Roman fort for some 20 years. Food was thrown to him over the wall. He was at times visited by pilgrims, whom he refused to see; but gradually a number of would-be disciples established themselves in caves and in huts around the mountain. Thus, a colony of ascetics was formed, who begged Anthony to come forth and be their guide in the spiritual life. Eventually, he yielded to their importunities and, about the year 305, emerged from his retreat. To the surprise of all, he appeared to be not emaciated, but healthy in mind and body.For five or six years he devoted himself to the instruction and organization of the great body of monks that had grown up around him; but then he once again withdrew into the inner desert that lay between the Nile and the Red Sea, near the shore of which he fixed his abode on a mountain (Mount Colzim) where still stands the monastery that bears his name, Der Mar Antonios. Here he spent the last forty-five years of his life, in a seclusion, not so strict as Pispir, for he freely saw those who came to visit him, and he used to cross the desert to Pispir with considerable frequency. Amid the Diocletian Persecutions, around 311 Anthony went to Alexandria and was conspicuous visiting those who were imprisoned.

Father of Monks 

Anthony was not the first ascetic or hermit, but he may properly be called the "Father of Monasticism" in Christianity, as he organized his disciples into a community and later, following the spread of Athanasius's hagiography, was the inspiration for similar communities throughout Egypt and elsewhere. Macarius the Great was a disciple of Anthony. Visitors traveled great distances to see the celebrated holy man. Anthony is said to have spoken to those of a spiritual disposition, leaving the task of addressing the more worldly visitors to Macarius. Macarius later founded a monastic community in the Scetic desert.

The fame of Anthony spread and reached Emperor Constantine, who wrote to him requesting his prayers. The brethren were pleased with the Emperor's letter, but Anthony was not overawed and wrote back exhorting the Emperor and his sons not to esteem this world but remember the next.

The stories of the meeting of Anthony and Paul of Thebes, the raven who brought them bread, Anthony being sent to fetch the cloak given him by "Athanasius the bishop" to bury Paul's body in, and Paul's death before he returned, are among the familiar legends of the Life. However, belief in the existence of Paul seems to have existed quite independently of the Life.

In 338, he left the desert temporarily to visit Alexandria to help refute the teachings of Arius.

Final days 
When Anthony sensed his death approaching, he commanded his disciples to give his staff to Macarius of Egypt, and to give one sheepskin cloak to Athanasius of Alexandria and the other sheepskin cloak to Serapion of Thmuis, his disciple. Anthony was interred, according to his instructions, in a grave next to his cell.

Temptation 

Accounts of Anthony enduring preternatural temptation during his sojourn in the Eastern Desert of Egypt inspired the often-repeated subject of the temptation of St. Anthony in Western art and literature.

Anthony is said to have faced a series of preternatural temptations during his pilgrimage to the desert. The first to report on the temptation was his contemporary Athanasius of Alexandria. It is possible these events, like the paintings, are full of rich metaphor or in the case of the animals of the desert, perhaps a vision or dream. Emphasis on these stories, however, did not really begin until the Middle Ages when the psychology of the individual became of greater interest.

Some of the stories included in Anthony's biography are perpetuated now mostly in paintings, where they give an opportunity for artists to depict their more lurid or bizarre interpretations. Many artists, including Martin Schongauer, Hieronymus Bosch, Dorothea Tanning, Max Ernst, Leonora Carrington and Salvador Dalí, have depicted these incidents from the life of Anthony; in prose, the tale was retold and embellished by Gustave Flaubert in The Temptation of Saint Anthony.

The satyr and the centaur 
 
Anthony was on a journey in the desert to find Paul of Thebes, who according to his dream was a better Hermit than he. Anthony had been under the impression that he was the first person to ever dwell in the desert; however, due to the dream, Anthony was called into the desert to find his "better", Paul. On his way there, he ran into two creatures in the forms of a centaur and a satyr. Although chroniclers sometimes postulated that they might have been living beings, Western theology considers them to have been demons.

While traveling through the desert, Anthony first found the centaur, a "creature of mingled shape, half horse half-man," whom he asked about directions. The creature tried to speak in an unintelligible language, but ultimately pointed with his hand the way desired, and then ran away and vanished from sight. It was interpreted as a demon trying to terrify him, or alternately a creature engendered by the desert.

Anthony found next the satyr, "a manikin with hooked snout, horned forehead, and extremities like goats's feet." This creature was peaceful and offered him fruits, and when Anthony asked who he was, the satyr replied, "I'm a mortal being and one of those inhabitants of the desert whom the Gentiles, deluded by various forms of error, worship under the names of Fauns, Satyrs, and Incubi. I am sent to represent my tribe. We pray you in our behalf to entreat the favor of your Lord and ours, who, we have learnt, came once to save the world, and 'whose sound has gone forth into all the earth.'" Upon hearing this, Anthony was overjoyed and rejoiced over the glory of Christ. He condemned the city of Alexandria for worshipping monsters instead of God while beasts like the satyr spoke about Christ.

Silver and gold 
Another time Anthony was travelling in the desert and found a plate of silver coins in his path.

Demons in the cave 
Once, Anthony tried to hide in a cave to escape the demons that plagued him. There were so many little demons in the cave though, that Anthony's servant had to carry him out because they had beaten him to death. When the hermits were gathered to Anthony's corpse to mourn his death, Anthony was revived. He demanded that his servants take him back to that cave where the demons had beaten him. When he got there he called out to the demons, and they came back as wild beasts to rip him to shreds. All of a sudden a bright light flashed, and the demons ran away. Anthony knew that the light must have come from God, and he asked God where he was before when the demons attacked him. God replied, "I was here but I would see and abide to see thy battle, and because thou hast mainly fought and well maintained thy battle, I shall make thy name to be spread through all the world."

Veneration 

Anthony had been secretly buried on the mountain-top where he had chosen to live. His remains were reportedly discovered in 361, and transferred to Alexandria. Some time later, they were taken from Alexandria to Constantinople, so that they might escape the destruction being perpetrated by invading Saracens. In the eleventh century, the Byzantine emperor gave them to the French Count Jocelin. Jocelin had them transferred to La-Motte-Saint-Didier, later renamed. There, Jocelin undertook to build a church to house the remains, but died before the church was even started. The building was finally erected in 1297 and became a centre of veneration and pilgrimage, known as Saint-Antoine-l'Abbaye.

Anthony is credited with assisting in a number of miraculous healings, primarily from ergotism, which became known as "St. Anthony's Fire". He was credited by two local noblemen of assisting them in recovery from the disease. They then founded the Hospital Brothers of St. Anthony in honor of him, who specialized in nursing the victims of skin diseases.

He is venerated especially by the Order of Saint Paul the First Hermit for his close association with St. Paul of Thebes after whom they take their name.  In the Life of St. Paul the First Hermit, by St. Jerome, it is recorded that it was St. Anthony that found St. Paul towards the end of his life and without whom it is doubtful he would be known.

Veneration of Anthony in the East is more restrained. There are comparatively few icons and paintings of him. He is, however, regarded as the "first master of the desert and the pinnacle of holy monks", and there are monastic communities of the Maronite, Chaldean, and Orthodox churches which state that they follow his monastic rule. During the Middle Ages, Anthony, along with Quirinus of Neuss, Cornelius and Hubertus, was venerated as one of the Four Holy Marshals (Vier Marschälle Gottes) in the Rhineland.

Anthony is remembered in the Anglican Communion with a Lesser Festival on 17 January.

Though Anthony himself did not organize or create a monastery, a community grew around him based on his example of living an ascetic and isolated life. Athanasius' biography helped propagate Anthony's ideals. Athanasius writes, "For monks, the life of Anthony is a sufficient example of asceticism.
His story influenced the conversion of Augustine of Hippo and John Chrysostom.

Coptic literature 

Examples of purely Coptic literature are the works of Anthony and Pachomius, who only spoke Coptic, and the sermons and preachings of Shenouda the Archmandrite, who chose to only write in Coptic. The earliest original writings in Coptic language were the letters by Anthony. During the 3rd and 4th centuries many ecclesiastics and monks wrote in Coptic.

Translations

See also

 Mount Colzim, Anthony's "Inner mountain"
 Coptic Saints
 Abba Anoub of Scetis
 Chariton the Confessor (mid-3rd century – c. 350), contemporary monk in the Judaean desert
 Desert Fathers and Desert Mothers, early Christian hermits, ascetics, and monks who lived mainly in the Scetes desert of Egypt beginning around the third century AD
 Abba Or of Nitria
 Hilarion (291–371), anchorite and saint considered by some to be the founder of Palestinian monasticism
 Monastery of Saint Anthony, Egypt
 Pachomius the Great (c. 292 – 348), Egyptian saint generally recognized as the founder of Christian cenobitic monasticism
 Patron saints of ailments, illness and dangers
 Paul of Thebes (c. 226/7 – c. 341), known as "Paul, the First Hermit", who preceded both Anthony and Chariton
 St. Anthony Hall, American fraternity and literary society
 Saint Anthony the Great, patron saint archive
 Serapion of Thmuis, disciple of Anthony
 Pitirim of Porphyry, disciple of Anthony

Notes

References

External links 

 "Spiritual Considerations on the Life of Saint Antony the Great" is a manuscript, from 1864, in Arabic, that is a translation of a Latin work about the life of Saint Anthony
 "Saint Anthony Abbot" at the Christian Iconography website
 "Of the Life of Saint Anthony" from Caxton's translation of the Golden Legend
 Colonnade Statue in St Peter's Square
 

 
356 deaths
3rd-century Egyptian people
4th-century Egyptian people
Saints from Roman Egypt
Egyptian hermits
Egyptian centenarians
Egyptian Christian monks
3rd-century Christian saints
4th-century Christian saints
3rd-century Romans
4th-century Romans
4th-century Christian theologians
Angelic visionaries
4th-century Christian monks
3rd-century Christian monks
4th-century writers
Antonii
250s births
Anglican saints
Men centenarians
Diocletianic Persecution
Desert Fathers
Philokalia